Sang-jun, also spelled Sang-joon, is a Korean male given name.

People with this name include:
Ji Sang-jun (born 1973), South Korean swimmer
Lee Sang-joon (born 1992), South Korean badminton player
Yang Sang-jun (born 1988), South Korean football player
Yoo Sang-joon, North Korean defector

Fictional characters with this name include:
Han Sang-jun, in 2006 South Korean film 200 Pounds Beauty
Yoo Sang-joon, real name of Baek San, in 2009 South Korean television series Iris and its 2013 sequel Iris II

See also
List of Korean given names

Korean masculine given names